Poplar may refer to:

Plants
Populus, the plant genus which includes most poplars, as well as aspen and cottonwood
 Black poplar (Populus nigra)
 Carolina or Canadian poplar, Populus × canadensis
 Grey poplar (Populus × canescens)
 White poplar
 Populus alba, native to Eurasia
 Populus grandidentata, bigtooth aspen
 Populus tremuloides, American aspen
 Liriodendron, the genus of tulip poplars
 Yellow poplar or tulip poplar (Liriodendron tulipifera)
 Liriodendron chinense, Chinese tulip poplar

Places

Canada
Poplar, Ontario, a community in the township of Burpee and Mills
Poplar Creek, British Columbia, a ghost town

United Kingdom
 Poplar, London
 Poplar High Street
 Metropolitan Borough of Poplar (1900–1965)
 Poplar DLR station
 Poplar (UK Parliament constituency)
 Poplar and Limehouse (UK Parliament constituency)
 Poplar Walk, Christ Church Meadow, Oxford

United States
 Poplar, California
 Poplar, Iowa
 Poplar, Minnesota
 Poplar, Montana
 Poplar, North Carolina in Mitchell County
 Poplar, Philadelphia 
 Poplar, Virginia
 Poplar, Wisconsin

Other uses
 Poplar (convenience store), a Japanese company
 Poplar Taneshima, a main character from the Working!! manga and anime series

See also
 Poplar Island (disambiguation)
 Poplar River (disambiguation)
 Poplar station (disambiguation)
 Poplar Tree Incident in Korea
 Popular (disambiguation)
 Populous (disambiguation)